"Distraction" is a song by American singer and songwriter Kehlani. It was released on July 23, 2016, and serves as the second single from her debut album SweetSexySavage (2016). In the song, Kehlani asks if a lover is willing to distract her from her work. The single was nominated for Best R&B Performance at the 60th Grammy Awards, marking Kehlani's second Grammy Award nomination.

Music video
The song's accompanying music video premiered on November 22, 2016 on Kehlani's YouTube account. The music video was directed by Yashxani.

Charts

Certifications

References

External links
Lyrics of this song at Genius

2016 singles
2016 songs
Kehlani songs
Atlantic Records singles
Songs written by Pop Wansel
Songs written by Oak Felder
Song recordings produced by Pop & Oak
Songs written by Kehlani